Kalamu is a municipality (commune) in the Funa district of Kinshasa, the capital city of the Democratic Republic of the Congo.

It forms the part of the city to the south of major buildings such as the Palais du Peuple ("Palace of the People"), the Stade des Martyrs ("Martyrs' Stadium") and Kinshasa's N'Dolo Airport.

The town contains the popular Matongé neighborhood, the Victoire roundabout and the Stade Tata Raphaël ("Father Raphael Stadium").

Demographics

References

See also 

Communes of Kinshasa
Funa District